All Saints is a 2017 American Christian drama film directed by Steve Gomer and written by Steve Armour. The film stars John Corbett, Cara Buono, Myles Moore, Nelson Lee, Barry Corbin, David Keith, Angela Fox, Chonda Pierce and Gregory Alan Williams, and follows a small-town Tennessee preacher who attempts to save his struggling church. It was released on August 25, 2017, by Affirm Films and Provident Films.

Premise
Based on a true story, a salesman-turned-pastor Michael Spurlock of a tiny Episcopal (Anglican) church in Smyrna, Tennessee is ordered to shut it down. He attempts to save the church, as well as a group of refugees from Karen State, Myanmar, in Southeast Asia.

Cast
 John Corbett as Michael Spurlock, a salesman-turned-pastor
 Cara Buono as Aimee Spurlock, Michael's wife
 Myles Moore as Atticus Spurlock, Michael and Aimee's son
 Nelson Lee as Ye Win
 Barry Corbin as Forrest
 David Keith as Boyd
 Angela Fox as Mary-O
 Chonda Pierce as Ruth
 Gregory Alan Williams as Bishop Thompson

Production
Filming began in September 2016 and continued through October, shooting in Nashville and Smyrna, Tennessee.

Reception

Box office
In North America, All Saints was released on August 25, 2017, alongside Birth of the Dragon and Leap!, and was projected to gross around $3–4 million from 846 theaters in its opening weekend. It made $150,000 on its first day and $1.6 million over the weekend, finishing 15th at the box office. The film's low opening was attributed to Hurricane Harvey hitting Texas and surrounding areas–typically faith-based regions–causing theaters to close, as well the boxing match between Floyd Mayweather and Conor McGregor on the Saturday. The combined weekend box office was the lowest-grossing since September 2001.

Critical response
On review aggregator website Rotten Tomatoes, the film has an approval rating of 95% based on 20 reviews, with an average rating of 7.3/10. On Metacritic, the film has a weighted average score of 63 out of 100, based on 7 critics, indicating "generally favorable reviews". Audiences polled by CinemaScore gave the film an average grade of "A−" on an A+ to F scale, while PostTrak reported filmgoers gave it an 85% overall positive score.

Frank Scheck of The Hollywood Reporter gave the film a positive review, writing: "By avoiding excessive proselytizing and instead simply and effectively relating its moving tale, All Saints proves stirring in a way many of its cinematic brethren do not."

References

External links
 
 

American drama films
2017 drama films
Films about Christianity
Films set in Tennessee
Films shot in Tennessee
Films directed by Steve Gomer
Affirm Films films
2010s English-language films
2010s American films